The Chicago Cubs baseball club is an original member of the National League (1876 to date), established in 1874 or 1870. Here is a list of players who appeared in at least one regular season game beginning 1874.

(Their 1870–1871 players are in :Category:Chicago White Stockings players among many others to about 1890.)

Bold identifies members of the National Baseball Hall of Fame.

Italics identify players with uniform numbers retired by the team. 
 


A

 David Aardsma, P, 2006
 Bert Abbey, P, 1893–1894, 1895
 Ted Abernathy, P, 1965, 1966, 1969–1970
 Cliff Aberson, OF, 1947–1949
 Johnny Abrego, P, 1985
 Jimmy Adair, SS, 1931
 Jason Adam, P, 2020
 Karl Adams, P, 1915
 Red Adams, P, 1946
 Terry Adams, P, 1995–1999
 Sparky Adams, 2B, 1922–1927
 Bobby Adams, 3B, 1957–1959
 Mike Adams, OF, 1976–1977
 Bob Addis, OF, 1952–1953
 Bob Addy, OF, 1876
 Dewey Adkins, P, 1949
 Jim Adduci, IF, 2019
 Rick Aguilera, P, 1999–2001
 Hank Aguirre, P, 1969–1970
 Jack Aker, P, 1972, 1973
 Arismendy Alcántara, 2B, 2014—2015
 Dale Alderson, P, 1943–1944
 Vic Aldridge, P, 1917–1924
Grover Alexander, P, 1918–1926
 Manny Alexander, SS, 1997–1999
 Matt Alexander, OF, 1973–1974
 Antonio Alfonseca, P, 2002–2003
 Nick Allen, C, 1916
 Ethan Allen, OF, 1936
 Milo Allison, OF, 1913–1914
 Moisés Alou, OF, 2002–2004
 Albert Almora, OF, 2016–2020
 Porfi Altamirano, P, 1984
 George Altman, OF, 1959–1962, 1965–1967
 Adbert Alzolay, P, 2019
 Joey Amalfitano, 2B, 1964–1967
 Vicente Amor, P, 1955
 Bob Anderson, P, 1957–1962
 Brett Anderson, P, 2017
 Jimmy Anderson, P, 2004
 John André, P, 1955
 Shane Andrews, 3B, 1999–2000
 Jim Andrews, OF, 1890
 Fred Andrus, OF, 1876–1884
 Tom Angley, C, 1929
Cap Anson, 1B, 1876–1897
 Jimmy Archer, C, 1909–1917
 José Arcia, SS, 1968
 Alex Arias, SS, 1992
 Jamie Arnold, P, 2000
 Jake Arrieta, P, 2013–2017, 2021
 Jim Asbell, OF, 1938
 José Ascanio, P, 2008–09
 Jairo Asencio, P, 2012
Richie Ashburn, OF, 1960–1961
 Ken Aspromonte, 2B, 1963
 Paul Assenmacher, P, 1989–1993
 Mitch Atkins, P, 2009-2010
 Toby Atwell, C, 1952–1953
 Earl Averill Jr., C, 1959, 1960
 Alex Avila, C, 2017
 Bobby Ayala, P, 1999–2000
 Manny Aybar, P, 2001

B

 Fred Baczewski, P, 1953
 Ed Baecht, P, 1931–1932
 Javier Báez, IF, 2014–2021
 Ed Bailey, C, 1965
 Sweetbread Bailey, P, 1919–1920, 1921
 Gene Baker, 2B, 1953–1957
 Jeff Baker, IF-OF, 2009–12
 John Baker, C, 2014
 Scott Baker, P, 2013
 Tom Baker, P, 1963
 Paul Bako, C, 2003–2004
 Mark Baldwin, P, 1887–1888
 Jay Baller, P, 1985–1987
 Tony Balsamo, P, 1962
 Ernie Banks, SS-1B, 1953–1971
 Willie Banks, P, 1993–1995
 Steve Barber, P, 1970
 Turner Barber, OF, 1917–1922
 Bret Barberie, 2B, 1996
 Richard Barker, P, 1999–2000
 Ross Barnes, 2B, 1876–1877
 Tony Barnette, P, 2019
 Darwin Barney, 2B, 2010–14
 Cuno Barragan, C, 1961–1963
 Bob Barrett, 3B, 1923–1925
 Dick Barrett, P, 1943
 Michael Barrett, C, 2004–2007
 Shad Barry, OF, 1904, 1905
 Dick Bartell, SS, 1939
 Vince Barton, OF, 1931–1932
 Cliff Bartosh, P,2005
 Anthony Bass, P, 2018
 Charlie Bastian, SS, 1889
 Johnny Bates, OF, 1914
 Miguel Batista, P, 1996–1997
 Allen Battle, OF, 1998–1999
 Russ Bauers, P, 1946
 Frank Baumann, P, 1965
 Frank Baumholtz, OF, 1949, 1951–1955
 José Bautista, P, 1993–1994
 Mike Baxter, OF, 2015
 Tommy Beals, OF, 1880
 Dave Beard, P, 1985
 Ginger Beaumont, OF, 1910
 Rod Beck, P, 1998–1999
 Clyde Beck, 3B, 1926–1930
 Heinz Becker, 1B, 1943–1946
 Glenn Beckert, 2B, 1965–1973
 Fred Beebe, P, 1906
 Dallas Beeler, P, 2014–2015
 Jeff Beliveau, P, 2012
 George Bell, OF, 1991
 Les Bell, 3B, 1930–1931
 Mark Bellhorn, 2B, 2002–2003
 Francis Beltrán, P,2002, 2004
 Alan Benes, P,2002–2003
 Butch Benton, C, 1982
 Jason Bere, P, 2001–2002
 Justin Berg, P, 2009–11
 Jason Berken, P, 2012
 Joe Berry, P, 1942
 Quintin Berry, OF, 2015
 Damon Berryhill, C, 1987–1990, 1991
 Dick Bertell, C, 1960–1965, 1967
 Oscar Bielaski, OF, 1875, 1876
 Mike Bielecki, P, 1988–1990, 1991
 Larry Biittner, OF, 1976, 1977–1980
 Steve Bilko, 1B, 1954
 Doug Bird, P, 1981, 1982
 Bill Bishop, P, 1889
 Hi Bithorn, P, 1942–1946
 Earl Blackburn, C, 1917
 Tim Blackwell, C, 1978–1981
 Rick Bladt, OF, 1969
 Footsie Blair, 2B, 1929–1931
 Sheriff Blake, P, 1924–1931
 Andrés Blanco, 2B-SS, 2009
 Henry Blanco, C, 2005–2008
 Kevin Blankenship, P, 1988–1990
 Jeff Blauser, SS, 1998–2000
 Cy Block, 3B, 1942–1946
 Randy Bobb, C, 1968–1969
 John Boccabella, C, 1963–1968
 Brian Bogusevic, OF, 2013
 Jim Bolger, OF, 1955–1958
 Bobby Bonds, OF, 1981
 Julio Bonetti, P, 1940
 Bill Bonham, P, 1971–1977
 Emilio Bonifacio, IF/OF, 2014
 Zeke Bonura, 1B, 1940
 Julio Borbon, OF, 2013
 George Borchers, P, 1888
 Rich Bordi, P, 1983–1984
 Bob Borkowski, OF, 1950–1951
 Steve Boros, 3B, 1963
 Joe Borowski, P, 2001–2005
 Hank Borowy, P, 1945, 1946–1948
 J. C. Boscán, C, 2013
 Shawn Boskie, P, 1990–1994
 Thad Bosley, OF, 1983–1986
 David Bote, IF, 2018–present
 Derek Botelho, P, 1985
 John Bottarini, C, 1937
 Kent Bottenfield, P, 1996–1997
 Ed Bouchee, 1B, 1960, 1961
 Pat Bourque, 1B, 1971–1973
 Larry Bowa, SS, 1982–1985
 Michael Bowden, P, 2012–2013
 Rob Bowen, C, 2007
 Micah Bowie, P, 1999
 Bob Bowman, P, 1942
 Bill Bowman, C, 1891
 Brad Brach, P, 2019
 George Bradley, P, 1877
 Bill Bradley, 3B, 1899–1900
 Milton Bradley, OF, 2009
 Spike Brady, OF, 1875
 Mike Brannock, 3B, 1875
 Kitty Bransfield, 1B, 1911
 Danny Breeden, C, 1971
 Hal Breeden, 1B, 1971
 William Brennan, P, 1993
Roger Bresnahan, C, 1900, 1913–1915
 Herb Brett, P, 1924–1925
 Jim Brewer, P, 1960–1963
 Charlie Brewster, SS, 1944
 Al Bridwell, SS, 1913
 Buttons Briggs, P, 1896–1905
 John Briggs, P, 1956–1958
 Dan Briggs, 1B, 1982
 Harry Bright, 1B, 1965
 Jim Brillheart, P, 1927
 Leon Brinkopf, SS, 1952
 Pete Broberg, P, 1977
Lou Brock, OF, 1961–1964
 Tarrik Brock, OF, 1999–2000
 Ernie Broglio, P, 1964, 1965–1966
 Herman Bronkie, 3B, 1914
 Mandy Brooks, OF, 1925–1926
 Jim Brosnan, P, 1954–1958
 Rex Brothers. P, 2020
 Brant Brown, OF, 1996–1998, 2000
 Joe Brown, P, 1884
 Jophery Brown, P, 1968
 Jumbo Brown, P, 1925
 Lew Brown, C, 1879
Mordecai Brown, P, 1904–1912, 1916
 Ray Brown, P, 1909
 Roosevelt Brown, OF, 1999–2002
 Tommy Brown, SS, 1952, 1953
 Byron Browne, OF, 1965–1967
 George Browne, OF, 1909
 Mike Brumley, SS, 1987
 Warren Brusstar, P, 1983–1985
 Clay Bryant, P, 1935–1940
 Don Bryant, C, 1966
 Kris Bryant, 3B, 2015–2021
 Tod Brynan, P, 1888
 Bill Buckner, 1B, 1977–1984
 Jake Buchanan, P, 2016-2017
 Steve Buechele, 3B, 1992, 1993–1995
 Art Bues, 3B, 1914
 Damon Buford, OF, 1999–2001
 Bob Buhl, P, 1962, 1963–1966
 Scott Bullett, OF, 1995–1996
 Jim Bullinger, P, 1992–1996
 Freddie Burdette, P, 1962–1964
 Lew Burdette, P, 1964, 1965
 Smoky Burgess, C, 1949–1951
 Leo Burke, OF, 1963, 1964–1965
 Alex Burnett, P, 2013
 Jeromy Burnitz, OF, 2005
 Tom Burns, 3B, 1880–1891
 Ray Burris, P, 1973–1979
 John Burrows, P, 1943, 1944
 Ellis Burton, OF, 1963, 1964–1965
 Dick Burwell, P, 1960–1961
 Guy Bush, P, 1923–1934
 Eddie Butler, P, 2017-2018
 Johnny Butler, SS, 1928
 John Buzhardt, P, 1958–1959
 Freddie Bynum, 2B/OF, 2006
 Marlon Byrd, OF, 2010–12

C

 Alberto Cabrera, P, 2012–2013
 Trevor Cahill, P, 2016
 Miguel Cairo, 2B, 1997, 2001
 Marty Callaghan, OF, 1922–23
 Nixey Callahan, OF, 1897–1900
 Johnny Callison, OF, 1970–71
 Dick Calmus, P, 1967
 Dolph Camilli, 1B, 1933–1934
 Kid Camp, P, 1894
 Lew Camp, 3B, 1893–94
 Shawn Camp, P, 2012–2013
 Tony Campana, OF, 2011–12
 Bill Campbell, P, 1982–1983
 Joe Campbell, OF, 1967
 Gilly Campbell, C, 1933
 Mike Campbell, P, 1996
 Ron Campbell, 2B, 1964–1966
 Vin Campbell, OF, 1908
 Jim Canavan, OF, 1892
 Jeimer Candelario, 3B, 2016-2017
 Chris Cannizzaro, C, 1971
 Mike Capel, P, 1988
 Doug Capilla, P, 1979, 1980–1981
 José Cardenal, OF, 1972–1977
 Adrian Cardenas, 2B, 2012
 Don Cardwell, P, 1960, 1961–1962
 Tex Carleton, P, 1935–1938
 Esmailin Caridad, P, 2009-2010
 Victor Caratini, C, 2017–2020
 Don Carlsen, P, 1948
 Hal Carlson, P, 1927, 1928–1930
 Bill Carney, OF, 1904
 Bob Carpenter, P, 1947
 Chris Carpenter, P, 2011
 Cliff Carroll, OF, 1890–1891
 Al Carson, P, 1910
 Paul Carter, P, 1916–1920
 Joe Carter, OF, 1983
 Rico Carty, OF, 1973
 Bob Caruthers, OF, 1893
 Hugh Casey, P, 1935
 Doc Casey, 3B, 1903–1905
 Andrew Cashner, P, 2010–11
 Larry Casian, P, 1995–1997
 John Cassidy, OF, 1878
 Nicholas Castellanos, OF, 2019
 Frank Castillo, P, 1991–1997
 Lendy Castillo, P, 2012
 Welington Castillo, C, 2010–2015
 Starlin Castro, SS, 2010–2015
 Bill Caudill, P, 1979–1981
 Phil Cavarretta, 1B, 1934–1953
 Art Ceccarelli, P, 1959–1960
 Ronny Cedeño, SS, 2005–2007
 Xavier Cedeño, P, 2019
 Ron Cey, 3B, 1983–1986
 Andrew Chafin, P, 2020
 Cliff Chambers, P, 1948
Frank Chance, 1B, 1898–1912
 Lim Chang-yong, P, 2013
 Aroldis Chapman, P, 2016
 Harry Chapman, C, 1912
 Jaye Chapman, P, 2012
 Tyler Chatwood, P, 2017–present
 Jesse Chavez, P, 2018
 Virgil Cheeves, P, 1920–1923
 Larry Cheney, P, 1911–1914, 1915
 Rocky Cherry, P, 2007
 Scott Chiasson, P,2001–2002
 Cupid Childs, 2B, 1900–1901
 Pete Childs, 2B, 1901
 Bob Chipman, P, 1944–1949
 Harry Chiti, C, 1950–1956
 Hee-Seop Choi, 1B, 2002–2003
 Steve Christmas, C, 1986
 Loyd Christopher, OF, 1945
 Bubba Church, P, 1953, 1954–1955
 Len Church, P, 1966
 John Churry, C, 1924–1927
 Steve Cishek, P, 2018-2019
 Mark Clark, P, 1997, 1998
 Dad Clark, 1B, 1902
 Dave Clark, OF, 1990, 1997
 Dad Clarke, P, 1888
 Henry Clarke, P, 1898
 Tommy Clarke, C, 1918
 Sumpter Clarke, OF, 1920
John Clarkson, P, 1884–1887
 Fritz Clausen, P, 1893, 1894
 Clem Clemens, C, 1916
 Doug Clemens, OF, 1964, 1965
 Matt Clement, P,2002–2004
 Steve Clevenger, C, 2011–2013
 Ty Cline, OF, 1966
 Gene Clines, OF, 1977–1979
 Billy Clingman, 3B, 1900
 Otis Clymer, OF, 1913
 Andy Coakley, P, 1908, 1909
 Buck Coats, OF, 2006–2007
 Kevin Coffman, P, 1990
 Dick Cogan, P, 1899
 Frank Coggins, 2B, 1972
 Chris Coghlan, OF, 2014–2015, 2016
 Hy Cohen, P, 1955
 Phil Coke, P, 2015
 Jim Colborn, P, 1969–1971
 King Cole, P, 1909–1912
 Dave Cole, P, 1954
 Casey Coleman, P, 2010–12
 Joe Coleman, P, 1976
 Bill Collins, OF, 1911
 Dan Collins, OF, 1874
 Phil Collins, P, 1923
 Rip Collins, C, 1940
 Ripper Collins, 1B, 1937–1938
 Tim Collins, P, 2019
 Jackie Collum, P, 1957
 Tyler Colvin, OF, 2009–11
 Jorge Comellas, P, 1945
 Clint Compton, P, 1972
 Gerardo Concepción, P, 2016
 Bunk Congalton, OF, 1902
 Fritzie Connally, 3B, 1983
 Terry Connell, C, 1874
 Jim Connor, 2B, 1892–1899
 Bill Connors, P, 1966
 Chuck Connors, 1B, 1951
 Willson Contreras, C, 2016–present 
 Jim Cook, OF, 1903
 Ron Coomer, 1B, 2001
 Jimmy Cooney, SS, 1890–1892
 Jimmy Cooney, SS, 1926–1927
 Wilbur Cooper, P, 1925–1926
 Mort Cooper, P, 1949
 Walker Cooper, C, 1954, 1955
 Larry Corcoran, P, 1880–1885
 Mike Corcoran, P, 1884
 Manny Corpas, P, 2012
 Red Corriden, SS, 1913–1915
 Frank Corridon, P, 1904
 Jim Cosman, P, 1970
 Dick Cotter, C, 1912
 Hooks Cotter, 1B, 1922–1924
 Henry Cotto, OF, 1984
 Ensign Cottrell, P, 1912
 Neal Cotts, P, 2007–2009
 Roscoe Coughlin, P, 1890
 Wes Covington, OF, 1966
 Billy Cowan, OF, 1963–1964
 Larry Cox, C, 1978, 1982
 Doug Creek, P, 1999
 Chuck Crim, P, 1994
 Harry Croft, OF, 1901
 George Crosby, P, 1884
 Ken Crosby, P, 1975–1976
 Jeff Cross, SS, 1948
 Héctor Cruz, OF, 1978, 1981–1982
 Juan Cruz, P, 2001–2003
 Dick Culler, SS, 1948
 Ray Culp, P, 1967
 Will Cunnane, P, 2001–2002
 Bert Cunningham, P, 1900–1901
 Doc Curley, 2B, 1899
 Clarence Currie, P, 1903
 Cliff Curtis, P, 1911
 Jack Curtis, P, 1961–1962
 Jack Cusick, SS, 1951
 Ned Cuthbert, OF, 1874
Kiki Cuyler, OF, 1928–1935
 Mike Cvengros, P, 1929

D

 Bill Dahlen, SS, 1891–1898
 Babe Dahlgren, 1B, 1941, 1942
 Con Daily, C, 1896
 Dom Dallessandro, OF, 1940–1947
 Abner Dalrymple, OF, 1879–1886
 Tom Daly, C, 1918–1921
 Tom Daly, 2B, 1887–1888
 Kal Daniels, OF, 1992
 Alvin Dark, SS, 1958, 1959
 Dell Darling, C, 1649–1889
 Yu Darvish, P, 2018–present
 Bobby Darwin, OF, 1977
 Doug Dascenzo, OF, 1988–1992
 Bill Davidson, OF, 1909
 Brock Davis, OF, 1970–1971
 Curt Davis, P, 1936, 1937
 Doug Davis, P, 2011
 Jody Davis, C, 1981–1987, 1988
 Jim Davis, P, 1954–1956
 Ron Davis, P, 1986, 1987
 Steve Davis, 2B, 1979
 Taylor Davis, C, 2017
 Tommy Davis, OF, 1970, 1972
 Wade Davis, P, 2017
Andre Dawson, OF, 1987–1992
 Boots Day, OF, 1970
 Brian Dayett, OF, 1985–1987
 Jorge De La Rosa, P, 2018
 Iván DeJesús, SS, 1977–1981
 Mark DeRosa, 2B/3B/OF, 2007–2008
 Delino DeShields, 2B, 2001–2002
 Charlie Deal, 3B, 1916, 1917–1921
 Wayland Dean, P, 1927
Dizzy Dean, P, 1938–1941
 George Decker, OF, 1892–1897
 Joe Decker, P, 1969–1972
 David DeJesus, OF, 2012–2013
 Jim Delahanty, 2B, 1901
 Bobby Del Greco, OF, 1957
 Fred Demarais, P, 1890
 Al Demaree, P, 1917
 Frank Demaree, OF, 1932–1938
 Harry DeMiller, P, 1892
 Gene DeMontreville, 2B, 1899
 Ryan Dempster, P, 2004–12
 Chris Denorfia, OF, 2015
 Roger Denzer, P, 1897
 Matt Dermody, P, 2020
 Bob Dernier, OF, 1984–1987
 Claud Derrick, SS, 1914
 Paul Derringer, P, 1943–1945
 Daniel Descalso, IF, OF, 2019
 Tom Dettore, P, 1974–1976
 Jim Devlin, P, 1874–1875
 Blake DeWitt, 2B, 2010–12
 Charlie Dexter, OF, 1900–1901, 1902
 Thomas Diamond, P, 2010
 Mike DiFelice, C, 2004
 Frank DiPino, P, 1986, 1987–1988
 Mike Diaz, 1B, 1983
 Lance Dickson, P, 1990
 Steve Dillard, 2B, 1979–1981
 Pickles Dillhoefer, C, 1917
 Miguel Diloné, OF, 1979
 Alec Distaso, P, 1969
 John Dobbs, OF, 1902, 1903
 Jess Dobernic, P, 1948–1949
 Cozy Dolan, OF, 1900, 1901
 John Dolan, P, 1895
 Tom Dolan, C, 1879
 Rafael Dolis, P, 2011–2013
 Tim Donahue, C, 1895–1900
 Frank Donnelly, P, 1893
 Ed Donnelly, P, 1959
 Mickey Doolan, SS, 1916
 Brian Dorsett, C, 1996
 Jack Doscher, P, 1903
 Herm Doscher, 3B, 1879
 Felix Doubront, P, 2014
 Phil Douglas, P, 1915, 1917–1919
 Taylor Douthit, OF, 1933
 Dave Dowling, P, 1966
 Tom Downey, SS, 1912
 Scott Downs, P, 2000
 Red Downs, 2B, 1912
 Jack Doyle, 1B, 1901
 Larry Doyle, 2B, 1916, 1917
 Jim Doyle, 3B, 1911
 Moe Drabowsky, P, 1956–1960
 Sammy Drake, 2B, 1960–1961
 Solly Drake, OF, 1956
 Paddy Driscoll, infield, 1917
 Dick Drott, P, 1957–1961
 Monk Dubiel, P, 1949–1952
 Jason Dubois, OF, 2004–2005
 Brian Duensing, P, 2017-2018
Hugh Duffy, OF, 1888–1889
 Nick Dumovich, P, 1923
 Courtney Duncan, P,2001–2002
 Jim Dunegan, P, 1970
 Sam Dungan, OF, 1892–1894, 1900
 Ron Dunn, 2B, 1974–1975
 Shawon Dunston, SS, 1985–1995, 1997
 Todd Dunwoody, OF, 2001
 Blaine Durbin, OF, 1907–1908
 Leon Durham, 1B, 1981–1988
 Frank Dwyer, P, 1888–1889

E

 Don Eaddy, 3B, 1959
 Bill Eagan, 2B, 1893
 Howard Earl, OF, 1890
 Arnold Earley, P, 1966
 Mal Eason, P, 1900–1902
 Roy Easterwood, C, 1944
 Rawly Eastwick, P, 1981
 Vallie Eaves, P, 1941–1942
 Angel Echevarria, OF, 2002
Dennis Eckersley, P, 1984–1986
 Charlie Eden, OF, 1877
 Tom Edens, P, 1995
 Jim Edmonds, OF, 2008
 Bruce Edwards, C, 1951–1954
 Carl Edwards Jr., P, 2016-2019
 Hank Edwards, OF, 1949, 1950
 Dave Eggler, OF, 1877
 Ed Eiteljorge, P, 1890
 Lee Elia, SS, 1968
 Pete Elko, 3B, 1943–1944
 Rowdy Elliott, C, 1916–1918
 Allen Elliott, 1B, 1923–1924
 Carter Elliott, SS, 1921
 Jim Ellis, P, 1967
 Dick Ellsworth, P, 1958–1966
 Don Elston, P, 1953, 1957–1964
 Mario Encarnación, OF, 2002
 Steve Engel, P, 1985
 Woody English, SS, 1927–1936
 Al Epperly, P, 1938
 Paul Erickson, P, 1941–1948
 Frank Ernaga, OF, 1957–1958
 Dick Errickson, P, 1942
 Shawn Estes, P, 2003
 Chuck Estrada, P, 1966
 Uel Eubanks, P, 1922
 Bill Everitt, 1B, 1895–1900
Johnny Evers, 2B, 1902–1913
 Scott Eyre, P, 2006–2008

F

 Jim Fanning, C, 1954–1957
 Carmen Fanzone, 3B, 1971–1974
 Kyle Farnsworth, P, 1999–2004
 Duke Farrell, C, 1888–1889
 Doc Farrell, SS, 1930
 Luke Farrell, P, 2018
 Jeff Fassero, P, 2001–2002
 Darcy Fast, P, 1968
 Bill Faul, P, 1965–1966
 Vern Fear, P, 1952
 Marv Felderman, C, 1942
 Scott Feldman, P, 2013
 John Felske, C, 1968
 Charlie Ferguson, P, 1901
 Bob Ferguson, 3B, 1878
 Félix Fermín, SS, 1996
 Frank Fernández, C, 1971, 1972
 Jesús Figueroa, OF, 1980
 Tom Filer, P, 1982
 William Fischer, C, 1916
 Bob Fisher, SS, 1914–1915
 Howie Fitzgerald, OF, 1922–1924
 Max Flack, OF, 1916–1922
 John Flavin, P, 1964
 Bill Fleming, P, 1942–1946
 Scott Fletcher, SS, 1981–1982
 Silver Flint, C, 1879–1889
 Jesse Flores, P, 1942
 Dylan Floro, P, 2017
 Cliff Floyd, OF, 2007
 John Fluhrer, OF, 1915
 Jocko Flynn, P, 1886–1887
 George Flynn, OF, 1896
 Gene Fodge, P, 1958
 Will Foley, 3B, 1875
 Dee Fondy, 1B, 1951–1957
 Ray Fontenot, P, 1985–1986
 Mike Fontenot, IF, 2005–2010
 Barry Foote, C, 1979–1981
 Davy Force, SS, 1874
 Tony Fossas, P, 1998
 Kevin Foster, P, 1994–1998
 Elmer Foster, OF, 1890–1891
 Dexter Fowler, OF, 2015–2016
 Chad Fox, P, 2005, 2008-2009
 Jake Fox, OF, 2007, 2009
 Bill Foxen, P, 1910, 1911
Jimmie Foxx, 1B, 1942–1944
 Ken Frailing, P, 1974–1976
 Ossie France, P, 1890
 Matt Franco, 1B, 1995
 Terry Francona, 1B, 1986
 Seth Frankoff, P, 2017
 Chick Fraser, P, 1907–1909
 George Frazier, P, 1984–1986
 Ryan Freel, 3B-OF, 2009
 Buck Freeman, P, 1921–1922
 Hersh Freeman, P, 1958
 Mark Freeman, P, 1960
 Mike Freeman (baseball), IF, 2017
 George Freese, 3B, 1961
 Howard Freigau, 3B, 1925–1927
 Larry French, P, 1935–1941
 Lonny Frey, 2B, 1937, 1947
 Bernie Friberg, 3B, 1919–1925
 Danny Friend, P, 1895–1898
 Owen Friend, 2B, 1955–1956
 Woodie Fryman, P, 1978
 Oscar Fuhr, P, 1921
 Kyuji Fujikawa, P, 2013-2014
 Kosuke Fukudome, OF, 2008–11
 Sam Fuld, OF, 2007, 2009-2010
 Fred Fussell, P, 1922–1923
 Mike Fyhrie, P, 2001

G

 Gabe Gabler, 1958
 Len Gabrielson, OF, 1964, 1965
 Gary Gaetti, 3B, 1998–1999
 Phil Gagliano, 2B, 1970
 Steve Gajkowski, P, 1998–1999
 Augie Galan, OF, 1934–1941
 Sean Gallagher, P, 2007–2008
 Oscar Gamble, OF, 1969
 Bill Gannon, OF, 1901
 John Ganzel, 1B, 1900
 Joe Garagiola, C, 1953, 1954
 Bob Garbark, C, 1937–1939
 Rich Garcés, P, 1995
 Jaime Garcia, P, 2018
 Robel Garcia, IF, 2019
 Nomar Garciaparra, SS, 2004–2005
 Jim Gardner, P, 1902
 Rob Gardner, P, 1967
 Daniel Garibay, P,2000
 Mike Garman, P, 1976
 Adrian Garrett, DH, 1970, 1973–1975
 Cecil Garriott, 1946
 Ned Garvin, P, 1899–1900
 Matt Garza, P, 2011–2013
 Charlie Gassaway, P, 1944
 Ed Gastfield, C, 1885
 Joey Gathright, OF, 2009
 John Gaub, P, 2011
 Chad Gaudin, P, 2008
 Chippy Gaw, P, 1920
 Dave Geisel, P, 1978–1981
 Emil Geiss, P, 1887
 Greek George, C, 1941
 Dave Gerard, P, 1962
 George Gerberman, P, 1962
 Justin Germano, P, 2012
 Gonzalez Germen, P, 2015
 Dick Gernert, 1B, 1960
 Jody Gerut, OF, 2005
 Doc Gessler, OF, 1906
 Robert Gibson, P, 1890
 Norm Gigon, 2B, 1967
 Charlie Gilbert, OF, 1941–1946
 Johnny Gill, OF, 1935–1936
 Cole Gillespie, OF, 2013
 Paul Gillespie, C, 1942–1945
 Henry Gilroy, C, 1874
 Joe Girardi, C, 1989–1992, 2000–2002
 Dave Giusti, P, 1977
 Fred Glade, P, 1902
 Doug Glanville, OF, 1996–1997, 2003
 Jim Gleeson, OF, 1939–1940
 Bob Glenalvin, 2B, 1890–1893
 Ed Glenn, SS, 1902
 John Glenn, OF, 1874–1877
 Ross Gload, 1B, 2000
 Al Glossop, 2B, 1946
 John Goetz, P, 1960
 Mike Golden, OF, 1875
 Fred Goldsmith, P, 1880–1884
 Walt Golvin, 1B, 1922
 Leo Gómez, 3B, 1996
 Alberto González, IF, 2013
 Carlos González, OF, 2019
 Geremi González, P, 1997–1998
 Mike González, C, 1925–1929
 Alex S. Gonzalez, SS, 2002–2004
 Luis Gonzalez, OF, 1995–1996
 Raúl González, OF, 2000
 Wilbur Good, OF, 1911–1915
 Ival Goodman, OF, 1943–1944
 Curtis Goodwin, OF, 1999
 Tom Goodwin, OF, 2003–2004
 Tom Gordon, P, 2000–2002
 Mike Gordon, C, 1977–1978
 George Gore, OF, 1879–1886
 Terrance Gore, OF, 2018
 Hank Gornicki, P, 1941
 Johnny Goryl, 2B, 1957–1959
 Tom Gorzelanny, P, 2009-2010
Rich Gossage, P, 1988
 Billy Grabarkewitz, 3B, 1974
 John Grabow, P, 2009–11
 Earl Grace, C, 1929–1931
 Mark Grace, 1B, 1988–2000
 Peaches Graham, C, 1903, 1911
 Alex Grammas, SS, 1962, 1963
 Hank Grampp, P, 1927–1929
 Tom Grant, OF, 1983
 George Grantham, 2B, 1922–1924
 Joe Graves, 3B, 1926
 Jeff Gray, P, 2010
 Danny Green, OF, 1898–1901
 Adam Greenberg, OF, 2005
 Willie Greene, 3B, 2000
 Kevin Gregg, P, 2009, 2013
 Lee Gregory, P, 1964
 Ben Grieve, OF, 2004–2005
 Hank Griffin, P, 1911
 Mike Griffin, P, 1981
 Frank Griffith, P, 1892
Clark Griffith, P, 1893–1900
 Tommy Griffith, OF, 1925
 Denver Grigsby, OF, 1923–1925
Burleigh Grimes, P, 1932–1933
 Ray Grimes, 1B, 1921–1924
 Charlie Grimm, 1B, 1925–1936
 Justin Grimm, P, 2013–2017
 Greg Gross, OF, 1977–1978
 Ernie Groth, P, 1904
 Mark Grudzielanek, 2B, 2003–2004
 Marv Gudat, OF, 1932
 Matt Guerrier, P, 2013
 Ad Gumbert, P, 1888–1889, 1891–1892
 Dave Gumpert, P, 1985–1986
 Larry Gura, P, 1970–1973, 1985
 Frankie Gustine, 2B, 1949
 Charlie Guth, P, 1880
 Mark Guthrie, P, 1999–2000, 2003
 Ricky Gutiérrez, SS, 2000–2001
 José Guzmán, P, 1993–1994
 Ángel Guzmán, P, 2006-2009

H

 Eddie Haas, OF, 1957
 Stan Hack, 3B, 1932–1947
 Warren Hacker, P, 1948–1956
 Casey Hageman, P, 1914
 Rip Hagerman, P, 1909
 Johnny Hairston, C, 1969
 Jerry Hairston Jr., 2B, 2005–2006
 Scott Hairston, OF, 2013
 Drew Hall, P, 1986–1988
 Jimmie Hall, OF, 1969, 1970
 Mel Hall, OF, 1981–1984
 Jimmy Hallinan, SS, 1877, 1878
 Cole Hamels, P, 2018-2019
 Billy Hamilton, OF, 2020
 Steve Hamilton, P, 1972
 Jason Hammel, P, 2014, 2015-2016
 Ralph Hamner, P, 1947–1949
 Justin Hancock, P, 2018
 Bill Hands, P, 1966–1972
 Chris Haney, P, 1998
 Todd Haney, 2B, 1994–1996
 Fred Haney, 3B, 1927
 Frank Hankinson, 3B, 1878–1879
 Bill Hanlon, 1B, 1903
 Dave Hansen, 3B, 1997
 Ollie Hanson, P, 1921
 Ed Hanyzewski, P, 1942–1946
 Ian Happ, OF, 2017–present
 Bill Harbridge, OF, 1878–1879
 Rich Harden, P, 2008–2009
 Lou Hardie, C, 1886
 Bud Hardin, SS, 1952
 Jason Hardtke, 2B, 1998
 Alex Hardy, P, 1902–1903
 Jack Hardy, C, 1907
 Dan Haren, P, 2015
 Alan Hargesheimer, P, 1983
 Bubbles Hargrave, C, 1913–1915
 Mike Harkey, P, 1988–1993
 Dick Harley, OF, 1903
 Jack Harper, P, 1906
 Ray Harrell, P, 1939
 Vic Harris, 2B, 1974–1975
 Brendan Harris, 2B, 2004
 Lenny Harris, 3B, 2003
 Kevin Hart, P, 2007-2009
 Chuck Hartenstein, P, 1965–1968
Gabby Hartnett, C, 1922–1940
 Topsy Hartsel, OF, 1901
 Jeff Hartsock, P, 1992
 Zaza Harvey, OF, 1900
 Ron Hassey, C, 1984
 Scott Hastings, C, 1875
 Billy Hatcher, OF, 1984–1985
 Joe Hatten, P, 1951–1952
 Grady Hatton, 3B, 1960
 LaTroy Hawkins, P, 2004–2005
 Jack Hayden, OF, 1908
 Bill Hayes, C, 1980–1981
 John Healy, P, 1889
 Bill Heath, C, 1969
 Cliff Heathcote, OF, 1922–1930
 Mike Heathcott, P, 1999–2000
 Richie Hebner, 3B, 1984–1985
 Mike Hechinger, C, 1912, 1913
 Jim Hegan, C, 1960
 Aaron Heilman, P, 2009
 Al Heist, OF, 1960–1961
 Rollie Hemsley, C, 1931, 1932
 Ken Henderson, OF, 1979, 1980
 Steve Henderson, OF, 1981–1982
 Bob Hendley, P, 1965–1967
 Harvey Hendrick, 1B, 1933
 Ellie Hendricks, C, 1972
 Jack Hendricks, OF, 1902
 Kyle Hendricks, 2014–present
 Claude Hendrix, P, 1916–1920
 George Hennessey, P, 1945
 Bill Henry, P, 1958–1959
 Roy Henshaw, P, 1933–1936
 Félix Heredia, P, 1998–2001
Billy Herman, 2B, 1931–1941
 Babe Herman, OF, 1933–1934
 Chad Hermansen, OF, 2002
 Gene Hermanski, OF, 1951–1953
 Chico Hernández, C, 1942–1943
 José Hernández, SS, 1994–1999, 2003
 Ramón Hernández, P, 1968, 1976–1977
 Willie Hernández, P, 1977–1983
 Tom Hernon, OF, 1897
 Leroy Herrmann, P, 1932–1933
 John Herrnstein, OF, 1966
 Jonathan Herrera, 2B, 2014-2015
 Jason Heyward, OF, 2016–present 
 Buck Herzog, 2B, 1919–1920
 Jack Hiatt, C, 1970
 John Hibbard, P, 1884
 Greg Hibbard, P, 1993
 Bryan Hickerson, P, 1995
 Eddie Hickey, 3B, 1901
 Jim Hickman, OF, 1968–1973
 Kirby Higbe, P, 1937–1939
 Irv Higginbotham, P, 1909
 Dick Higham, OF, 1875
 R.E. Hillebrand, OF, 1902
 Bobby Hill, 2B, 2002–2003
 Glenallen Hill, OF, 1993–1995, 1998–2000
 Koyie Hill, C, 2007–12
 Rich Hill, P, 2005–2007
 Frank Hiller, P, 1950–1951
 Dave Hillman, P, 1955–1959
 Paul Hines, OF, 1874–1877
 Alex Hinshaw, P, 2012
 Gene Hiser, OF, 1971–1975
 Don Hoak, 3B, 1956
 Glen Hobbie, P, 1957–1964
 Billy Hoeft, P, 1965–1966
 Nico Hoerner, IF, 2019–present
 Guy Hoffman, P, 1986
 Larry Hoffman, 3B, 1901
 Solly Hofman, OF, 1904–1912, 1916
 Micah Hoffpauir, 1B, 2008–2010
 Brad Hogg, P, 1915
 Derek Holland, P, 2019
 Todd Hollandsworth, OF, 2004–2005
 Ed Holley, P, 1928
 Jessie Hollins, P, 1992
 John Hollison, P, 1892
 Charlie Hollocher, SS, 1918–1924
 Billy Holm, C, 1943–1944
 Fred Holmes, C, 1904
 Ken Holtzman, P, 1965–1971, 1978–1979
 Marty Honan, C, 1890–1891
 Burt Hooton, P, 1971–1975
 Trader Horne, P, 1929
Rogers Hornsby, 2B, 1929–1932
 Tim Hosley, C, 1975–1976
 John Houseman, 2B, 1894
 Tyler Houston, 3B, 1996–1999
 Del Howard, OF, 1907–1909
 Cal Howe, P, 1952
 Jay Howell, P, 1981
 Bob Howry, P, 2006–2008, 2010
 Mike Hubbard, C, 1995–1997
 Trenidad Hubbard, OF, 2003
 Ken Hubbs, 2B, 1961–1963
 Johnny Hudson, 2B, 1941
 Tom Hughes, P, 1900–1901
 Jim Hughes, P, 1956
 Roy Hughes, 2B, 1944–1945
 Terry Hughes, 3B, 1970
 Joe Hughes, OF, 1902
 Jim Hughey, P, 1893
 Danny Hultzen, P, 2019
 Bob Humphreys, P, 1965
 Bert Humphries, P, 1913–1915
 Randy Hundley, C, 1966–1973, 1976–1977
 Todd Hundley, C, 2001–2002
 Herb Hunter, 3B, 1916, 1917
 Tommy Hunter, P, 2015
 Walt Huntzinger, P, 1926
 Don Hurst, 1B, 1934
 Jeff Huson, SS, 2000
 Bill Hutchinson, P, 1889–1895
 Ed Hutchinson, 2B, 1890
 Herb Hutson, P, 1974

I

 Blaise Ilsley, P, 1994
Monte Irvin, OF, 1956
 Charlie Irwin, 3B, 1893–1895
 Frank Isbell, 1B, 1898
 César Izturis, SS, 2006–2007

J

 Austin Jackson, OF, 2015
 Brett Jackson, CF, 2012
 Edwin Jackson, P, 2013–2015
 Larry Jackson, P, 1963–1966
 Danny Jackson, P, 1991–1992
 Damian Jackson, 2B, 2004
 Randy Jackson, 3B, 1950–1955, 1959
 Lou Jackson, OF, 1958–1959
 Darrin Jackson, OF, 1985–1989
 Elmer Jacobs, P, 1924–1925
 Tony Jacobs, P, 1948
 Mike Jacobs, SS, 1902
 Ray Jacobs, 1928
 Merwin Jacobson, OF, 1916
 Jake Jaeckel, P, 1964
 Joe Jaeger, P, 1920
 Art Jahn, OF, 1925
 Rick James, P, 1967
 Cleo James, OF, 1970–1973
 Jon Jay, OF, 2017
 Hal Jeffcoat, OF, 1948–1955
 Jeremy Jeffress, P, 2020
 Frank Jelincich, OF, 1941
 Fergie Jenkins, P, 1966–1973, 1982–1983
 Doug Jennings, OF, 1993
 Robin Jennings, OF, 1996–1997, 1999
 Garry Jestadt, 3B, 1971
 Manny Jiménez, OF, 1969
 Abe Johnson, P, 1893
 Ben Johnson, P, 1959–1960
 Bill Johnson, P, 1983–1984
 Cliff Johnson, DH, 1980
 Don Johnson, 2B, 1943–1948
 Davey Johnson, 2B, 1978
 Footer Johnson, 1958
 Howard Johnson, 3B, 1995
 Ken Johnson, P, 1969
 Lance Johnson, OF, 1997–1999
 Lou Johnson, OF, 1960, 1968
 Pierce Johnson, P, 2017
 Reed Johnson, OF, 2008–09, 2011–12
 Jimmy Johnston, 3B, 1914
 Jay Johnstone, OF, 1982–1984
 Roy Joiner, P, 1934–1935
 Eric Jokisch, P, 2014
 Charley Jones, OF, 1877
 Clarence Jones, OF, 1967–1968
 Davy Jones, OF, 1902–1904
 Doug Jones, P, 1995–1996
 Jacque Jones, OF, 2006–2007
 Percy Jones, P, 1920–1922, 1925–1928
 Sam Jones, P, 1955–1956
 Sheldon Jones, P, 1953
 Claude Jonnard, P, 1929
 Billy Jurges, SS, 1931–1938, 1946–1947

K

 Mike Kahoe, C, 1901–1902, 1907
 Don Kaiser, P, 1955–1957
 Al Kaiser, OF, 1911
 Ryan Kalish, OF, 2014,  2016
 John Kane, OF, 1909–1910
 Matt Karchner, P, 1998–2000
 Eric Karros, 1B, 2003
 Jack Katoll, P, 1898–1899
 Tony Kaufmann, P, 1921–1927
 Munenori Kawasaki, 2B, 2016
 Teddy Kearns, 1B, 1924–1925
 Chick Keating, SS, 1913–1915
 Vic Keen, P, 1921–1925
 George Keerl, 2B, 1875
 John Kelleher, 3B, 1921–1923
 Mick Kelleher, SS, 1976–1980
 Frank Kellert, 1B, 1956
 Bob Kelly, P, 1951–1953
George Kelly, 1B, 1930
King Kelly, OF, 1880–1886
 Joe Kelly, OF, 1916
 Joe Kelly, OF, 1926–1928
 David Kelton, OF, 2003–2004
 Tony Kemp, 2B/OF, 2019
 Jason Kendall, C 2007
 Ted Kennedy, P, 1885
 Junior Kennedy, 2B, 1982–1983
 Snapper Kennedy, OF, 1902
 Matt Keough, P, 1986
 Marty Keough, OF, 1966
 Mel Kerr, 1925
 Don Kessinger, SS, 1966–1975
 Brooks Kieschnick, P, 1996–1997
 Pete Kilduff, 2B, 1917–1919
 Paul Kilgus, P, 1989
 Bill Killefer, C, 1918–1921
 Frank Killen, P, 1900
 Matt Kilroy, P, 1898
 Newt Kimball, P, 1937–1938
 Craig Kimbrel, P, 2019–present
 Bruce Kimm, C, 1979
 Jerry Kindall, 2B, 1956–1961
 Ralph Kiner, OF, 1953, 1954
 Chick King, OF, 1958–1959
 Jim King, OF, 1955–1956
 Ray King, P, 1999
 Dave Kingman, OF, 1978–1980
 Brandon Kintzler, P, 2018
 Walt Kinzie, SS, 1884
 Jason Kipnis, 2B, 2020–present
 Jim Kirby, PH, 1949
 Chris Kitsos, SS, 1954
 Malachi Kittridge, C, 1890–1897
Chuck Klein, OF, 1934–1936
 Johnny Kling, C, 1900–1911
 Johnny Klippstein, P, 1950–1954
 Joe Klugmann, 2B, 1921–1922
 Joe Kmak, C, 1995
 Otto Knabe, 2B, 1916
 Pete Knisely, OF, 1913–1915
 Darold Knowles, P, 1975–1976
 Mark Koenig, SS, 1932–1933
 Elmer Koestner, P, 1914
 Cal Koonce, P, 1962–1967
 John Koronka, P,2005–2006
 Jim Korwan, P, 1897
 Fabian Kowalik, P, 1935, 1936
 Joe Kraemer, P, 1989–1990
 Randy Kramer, P, 1990
 Ken Kravec, P, 1981–1982
 Mike Kreevich, OF, 1931
 Mickey Kreitner, C, 1943–1944
 Jim Kremmel, P, 1974
 Bill Krieg, C, 1885
 Gus Krock, P, 1888–1889
 Rube Kroh, P, 1908–1910
 Chris Krug, C, 1965–1966
 Marty Krug, 3B, 1922
 Gene Krug, 1981
 Mike Krukow, P, 1976–1981
 Harvey Kuenn, OF, 1965–1966
 Jeff Kunkel, SS, 1992
 Emil Kush, P, 1941–1949

L

 Tony La Russa, 2B, 1973
 Tommy La Stella, 2B, 2015–2018
 John Lackey, P, 2016-2017
 Pete Lacock, 1B, 1972–1976
 Doyle Lade, P, 1946–1950
 Bryan LaHair, 1B, RF, 2011–12
 Junior Lake, OF, 2013–2015
 Steve Lake, C, 1983–1986, 1993
 Blake Lalli, C, 2012
 Jack Lamabe, P, 1968
 Pete Lamer, C, 1902
 Dennis Lamp, P, 1977–1980
 Hobie Landrith, C, 1956
 Bill Landrum, P, 1988
 Don Landrum, OF, 1962–1965
 Ced Landrum, OF, 1991
 Walt Lanfranconi, P, 1941
 Bill Lange, OF, 1893–1899
 Terry Larkin, P, 1878–1879
 Dave LaRoche, P, 1973–1974
 Vic LaRose, 2B, 1968
 Don Larsen, P, 1967
 Dan Larson, P, 1982
 Al Lary, P, 1954–1962
 Chuck Lauer, OF, 1890
 Jimmy Lavender, P, 1912–1916
 Vance Law, 3B, 1988–1989
 Matt Lawton, OF, 2005
Tony Lazzeri, 2B, 1938
 Tommy Leach, OF, 1912–1914
 Fred Lear, 3B, 1918–1919
 Hal Leathers, SS, 1920
 Jack Leathersich, P, 2017
 Bill Lee, P, 1934–1943, 1947
 Don Lee, P, 1966
 Derrek Lee, 1B, 2004-2010
 Tom Lee, P, 1884
 Craig Lefferts, P, 1983
 Hank Leiber, OF, 1939–1941
 Jon Leicester, P, 2004–2005
 Lefty Leifield, P, 1912, 1913
 DJ LeMahieu, IF, 2011
 Dick LeMay, P, 1963
 Dave Lemonds, P, 1969
 Bob Lennon, OF, 1957
 Ed Lennox, 3B, 1912
 Dutch Leonard, P, 1949–1953
 Roy Leslie, 1B, 1917
 Jon Lester, P, 2015–present
 Darren Lewis, OF, 2002
 Carlos Lezcano, OF, 1980–1981
 Jon Lieber, P, 1999–2002, 2008
 Gene Lillard, P, 1936–1939
 Brent Lillibridge, IF, 2013
 Ted Lilly, P, 2007–2010
Freddie Lindstrom, 3B, 1935
 Cole Liniak, 3B, 1999–2000
 Dick Littlefield, P, 1957
 Jack Littrell, SS, 1957
 Mickey Livingston, C, 1943, 1945–1947
 Hans Lobert, 3B, 1905
 Bob Locker, P, 1973–1975
 Kameron Loe, P, 2013
 Kenny Lofton, OF, 2003
 Bob Logan, P, 1937, 1938
 Bill Long, P, 1990
 Dale Long, 1B, 1957–1959
 Davey Lopes, 2B, 1984–1986
 Rafael Lopez, C, 2014
 Rodrigo López, P, 2011–12
 Andrew Lorraine, P, 1999–2000
 Jay Loviglio, 2B, 1983
 Grover Lowdermilk, P, 1912
 Bobby Lowe, 2B, 1902–1903
 Terrell Lowery, OF, 1997, 1998
 Turk Lown, P, 1951–1958
 Peanuts Lowrey, OF, 1942–1949
 Pat Luby, P, 1890–1892
 Jonathan Lucroy, C, 2019
 Fred Luderus, 1B, 1909–1910
 Mike Lum, OF, 1981
 Carl Lundgren, P, 1902–1909
 Tom Lundstedt, C, 1973–1974
 Keith Luuloa, SS, 2000
 Danny Lynch, 2B, 1948
 Ed Lynch, P, 1986, 1987
 Henry Lynch, OF, 1893
 Mike Lynch, OF, 1902
 Tom Lynch, P, 1884
 Red Lynn, P, 1944
 Dad Lytle, 2B, 1890

M

 John Mabry, OF, 2006
 Robert Machado, C, 2001–2002
 José Macías, 3B, 2004–2005
 Bill Mack, P, 1908
 Ray Mack, 2B, 1947
 Steve Macko, 2B, 1979–1980
 Len Madden, P, 1912
 Clarence Maddern, OF, 1946–1949
 Greg Maddux, P, 1986–1992, 2004–2006
 Bill Madlock, 3B, 1974–1976
 Sal Madrid, SS, 1947
 Dave Magadan, 3B, 1996
 Lee Magee, OF, 1919
 George Magoon, SS, 1899
 Freddie Maguire, 2B, 1928
 Ron Mahay, P, 2001–02
 Paul Maholm, P, 2012
 Pat Mahomes, P, 2002
 Mike Mahoney, C, 2000, 2002
 Scott Maine, P, 2010–12
 Willard Mains, P, 1888
 Oswaldo Mairena, P,2000
 George Maisel, OF, 1921–1922
 Mike Maksudian, 1B, 1994
 John Malarkey, P, 1899
 Candy Maldonado, OF, 1993
 Martín Maldonado, C, 2019
 Pat Malone, P, 1928–1934
 Fergy Malone, C, 1874
 Billy Maloney, OF, 1905
 Gus Mancuso, C, 1939
 Hal Manders, P, 1946
 Les Mann, OF, 1916–1919
 Garth Mann, P, 1944
 Dick Manville, P, 1952
 Dillon Maples, P, 2017–present
Rabbit Maranville, SS, 1925
 Carlos Mármol, P, 2006–2013
 Brailyn Márquez, P, 2020
 Gonzalo Márquez, 1B, 1973, 1974
 Luis Márquez, OF, 1954
 Jason Marquis, P, 2006–2008
 William Marriott, 3B, 1917–1921
 Doc Marshall, C, 1908
 Jim Marshall, 1B, 1958–1959
 Sean Marshall, P, 2006–11
 Frank Martin, 3B, 1898
 J. C. Martin, C, 1970–1972
 Jerry Martin, OF, 1979–1980
 Leonys Martin, OF, 2017
 Mike Martin, C, 1986
 Morrie Martin, P, 1959
 Speed Martin, P, 1918–1922
 Stu Martin, 2B, 1943
 Carmelo Martínez, OF, 1983
 Dave Martinez, OF, 1986–1988, 2000
 José Martínez, OF, 2020
 Ramón Martínez, SS, 2003–2004
 Sandy Martínez, C, 1998–1999
 Joe Marty, OF, 1937–1939
 Randy Martz, P, 1980–1982
 Mike Mason, P, 1987
 Gordon Massa, C, 1957–1958
 Juan Mateo, P, 2006
 Marcos Mateo, 2010–11
 Joe Mather, OF, 3B, 2012
 Nelson Mathews, OF, 1960–1963
 Gary Matthews, OF, 1984–1987
 Gary Matthews Jr., OF, 2000–2001
 Bobby Mattick, SS, 1938–1940
 Brian Matusz, P, 2016
 Gene Mauch, 2B, 1948–1949
 Hal Mauck, P, 1893
 Carmen Mauro, OF, 1948–1951
 Jason Maxwell, 2B, 1998
 Jakie May, P, 1931–1932
 Scott May, P, 1991
 Derrick May, OF, 1990–1994
 Cameron Maybin, OF, 2020
 Ed Mayer, P, 1957–1958
 Cory Mazzoni, P, 2018
 Bill McAfee, P, 1930
 Jim McAnany, OF, 1961–1962
 Ike McAuley, SS, 1925
 Algie McBride, OF, 1896
 Bill McCabe, OF, 1918–1919
 Bill McCabe, OF, 1920
 Dutch McCall, P, 1948
 Alex McCarthy, 2B, 1915, 1916
 Jack McCarthy, OF, 1900, 1903–1905
 Jim McCauley, C, 1885
 Harry McChesney, OF, 1904
 Scott McClain, 1B, 2005
 Bill McClellan, 2B, 1878
 Lloyd McClendon, OF, 1989–1990
 George McConnell, P, 1914, 1916
 Jim McCormick, P, 1885, 1886
 Barry McCormick, 3B, 1896–1901
 Clyde McCullough, C, 1940–1948, 1953–1956
 Lindy McDaniel, P, 1963–1965
 Darnell McDonald, OF, 2013
 Ed McDonald, 3B, 1913
 Chuck McElroy, P, 1991–1993
 Monte McFarland, P, 1895–1896
 Casey McGehee, P, 2008
 Willie McGill, P, 1893–1894
 Dan McGinn, P, 1972
 Gus McGinnis, P, 1893
 Lynn McGlothen, P, 1978–1981
 Fred McGriff, 1B, 2001–2002
 Harry McIntire, P, 1910–1912
 Jim McKnight, 3B, 1960–1962
 Polly McLarry, 2B, 1915
 Larry McLean, C, 1903
 Cal McLish, P, 1949–1951
 Jimmy McMath, OF, 1968
 Norm McMillan, 3B, 1928–1929
 Brian McNichol, P, 1999
 Brian McRae, OF, 1995–1997
 Cal McVey, 1B, 1876–1877
 George Meakim, P, 1892
 Yoervis Medina, P, 2015
 Russ Meers, P, 1941–1947
 Dave Meier, OF, 1988
 Sam Mejías, OF, 1979
 Jock Menefee, P, 1900–1903
 Rudy Meoli, SS, 1978
 Orlando Merced, OF, 1998
 Kent Mercker, P, 2004
 Ron Meridith, P, 1984–1985
 Fred Merkle, 1B, 1917–1920
 Lloyd Merriman, OF, 1955
 Bill Merritt, C, 1891
 Sam Mertes, OF, 1898–1900
 Lennie Merullo, SS, 1941–1947
 Steve Mesner, 3B, 1938–1939
 Catfish Metkovich, OF, 1953
 Roger Metzger, SS, 1970
 Alex Metzler, OF, 1925
 Dutch Meyer, 2B, 1937
 Russ Meyer, P, 1946–1948, 1956
 Levi Meyerle, 3B, 1874
 Chad Meyers, 2B, 1999–2001
 Ralph Michaels, 3B, 1924–1926
 Ed Mickelson, 1B, 1957
 Matt Mieske, OF, 1997–1998
 Pete Mikkelsen, P, 1967–1968
 Hank Miklos, P, 1944
 Eddie Miksis, 2B, 1951–1956
 Aaron Miles, IF, 2009
 Bob Miller, P, 1970–1971
 Damian Miller, C, 2003
 Doc Miller, OF, 1910
 Dusty Miller, OF, 1902
 Hack Miller, OF, 1922–1925
 Ian Miller, OF, 2020
 Joe Miller, 2B, 1875
 Kurt Miller, P, 1998–2000
 Ox Miller, P, 1947
 Tyson Miller, P, 2020
 Wade Miller, P, 2006–2007
 Ward Miller, OF, 1912–1913
 Alec Mills, P, 2018–present
 George Milstead, P, 1924–1926
 Paul Minner, P, 1950–1956
 Mike Mitchell, OF, 1913
 Sergio Mitre, P, 2003–2005
 George Mitterwald, C, 1974–1977
 Bill Moisan, P, 1953
 José Molina, C, 1999
 Bob Molinaro, OF, 1982
 Fritz Mollwitz, 1B, 1913–1914, 1916
 Rick Monday, OF, 1972–1976
 Craig Monroe, OF, 2007
 Lou Montañez, OF, 2011
 Miguel Montero, C, 2015–2017
 Mike Montgomery, P, 2016-2019
 Al Montreuil, 2B, 1972
 George Moolic, C, 1886
 Charley Moore, SS, 1912
 Donnie Moore, P, 1975–1979
 Earl Moore, P, 1913
 Johnny Moore, OF, 1928–1932, 1945
 Scott Moore, 3B, 2006–2007
 Jake Mooty, P, 1940–1943
 Jerry Morales, OF, 1974–1977, 1981–1983
 Bill Moran, C, 1895
 Pat Moran, C, 1906–1909
 Mickey Morandini, 2B, 1997–1999
 Seth Morehead, P, 1959, 1960
 Christopher Morel, 3B, 2022-present
 Ramón Morel, P, 1997
 Keith Moreland, OF, 1982–1987
 Mike Morgan, P, 1991–1995, 1998
 Bobby Morgan, 2B, 1957, 1958
 Vern Morgan, 3B, 1954–1955
 Moe Morhardt, 1B, 1961–1962
 George Moriarty, 3B, 1903–1904
 Jim Moroney, P, 1912
 Ed Morris, P, 1922
 Frank Morrissey, P, 1902
 Brandon Morrow, P, 2017
 Walt Moryn, OF, 1956–1960
 Paul Moskau, P, 1983
 Jim Mosolf, OF, 1933
 Mal Moss, P, 1930
 Jason Motte, P, 2015
 Jamie Moyer, P, 1986–1988
 Phil Mudrock, P, 1963
 Bill Mueller, 3B, 2000–2002
 Terry Mulholland, P, 1997–1999
 Eddie Mulligan, 3B, 1915–1916
 Jerry Mumphrey, OF, 1986–1988
 Bob Muncrief, P, 1949
 Joe Munson, OF, 1925–1926
 Bobby Murcer, OF, 1977–1979
 Daniel Murphy, 2B, 2018
 Danny Murphy, P, 1960–1962
 Donnie Murphy, 3B, 2013
 Jim Murray, OF, 1902
 Red Murray, OF, 1915
 Tony Murray, OF, 1923
 Calvin Murray, OF, 2004
 Matt Murton, LF, 2005–2008
 Randy Myers, P, 1993–1995
 Rodney Myers, P, 1996–2000
 Billy Myers, SS, 1941
 Richie Myers, PR/PH, 1956

N

 Chris Nabholz, P, 1995
 Xavier Nady, OF, 2010
 Tom Nagle, C, 1890–1891
 Buddy Napier, P, 1918
 Joe Nathan, P, 2016
 Joey Nation, P, 1999–2001
 Dioner Navarro, C, 2013
 Efren Navarro, 1B, 2018
 Jaime Navarro, P, 1995–1996
 Tom Needham, C, 1909–1914
 Cal Neeman, C, 1957–1960
 Art Nehf, P, 1927–1929
 Lynn Nelson, P, 1930–1934
 Dick Nen, 1B, 1968
 Phil Nevin, 1B, 2006
 Joel Newkirk, P, 1919–1920
 Ray Newman, P, 1971
 Charlie Newman, OF, 1892
 Bobo Newsom, P, 1932
 Dolan Nichols, P, 1958
 Art Nichols, C, 1898–1900
 Bill Nicholson, OF, 1939–1948
 Hugh Nicol, OF, 1881–1882
 George Nicol, OF, 1891
 Joe Niekro, P, 1967–1969
 José Nieves, SS, 1998–2001
 Al Nipper, P, 1988
 Paul Noce, 2B, 1987
 Dickie Noles, P, 1982–1984, 1987
 Pete Noonan, C, 1906
 Wayne Nordhagen, OF, 1983
 Irv Noren, OF, 1959, 1960
 Fred Norman, P, 1964–1967
 Billy North, OF, 1971–1972
 Ron Northey, OF, 1950, 1952
 Phil Norton, P,2000, 2003
 James Norwood, P, 2018–present
 Don Nottebart, P, 1969
 Lou Novikoff, OF, 1941–1944
 Roberto Novoa, P, 2005–2006
 Rube Novotney, C, 1949
 José Antonio Núñez, P, 1990
 Rich Nye, P, 1966–1969

O

 Mike O'Berry, C, 1980
 John O'Brien, 2B, 1893
 Pete O'Brien, 2B, 1890
 Johnny O'Connor, C, 1916
 Ken O'Dea, C, 1935–1938
 Bob O'Farrell, C, 1915–1925, 1934
 Hal O'Hagan, 1B, 1902
 Troy O'Leary, OF, 2003
 Ryan O'Malley, P,2006
 Emmett O'Neill, P, 1946
 Jack O'Neill, C, 1904–1905
 Will Ohman, P, 2000–2001, 2005–2007
 Augie Ojeda, SS, 2000–2003, 2006
 Gene Oliver, C, 1968–1969
 Nate Oliver, 2B, 1969
 Vern Olsen, P, 1939–1946
 Barney Olsen, OF, 1941
 Mike Olt, 3B, 2014–2015
 Steve Ontiveros, 3B, 1977–1980
 Rey Ordóñez, SS, 2004
 Kevin Orie, 3B, 1997–1998, 2002
 José Ortiz, OF, 1971
 Ramón Ortiz, P, 2011
 Bob Osborn, P, 1925–1930
 Tiny Osborne, P, 1922–1924
 Donovan Osborne, P,2002
 Josh Osich, P, 2020
 Johnny Ostrowski, OF, 1943–1946
 Reggie Otero, 1B, 1945
 Billy Ott, OF, 1962–1964
 Dave Otto, P, 1994
 Orval Overall, P, 1906–1913
 Ernie Ovitz, P, 1911
 Mickey Owen, C, 1949–1951
 Dave Owen, SS, 1983–1985

P

 Gene Packard, P, 1916–1917
 Andy Pafko, OF, 1943–1951
 Ángel Pagán, OF, 2006–2007
 Vance Page, P, 1938–1941
 Karl Pagel, 1B, 1978–1979
 Donn Pall, P, 1994
 Rafael Palmeiro, 1B, 1986–1988
 Milt Pappas, P, 1970–1973
 Erik Pappas, C, 1991
 Mark Parent, C, 1994–1995
 Blake Parker, P, 2012–2014
 Doc Parker, P, 1893–1896
 Roy Parmelee, P, 1937
 Jiggs Parrott, 3B, 1892–1895
 Tom Parrott, OF, 1893
 Dode Paskert, OF, 1918–1920
 Claude Passeau, P, 1939–1947
 Reggie Patterson, P, 1983–1985
 Bob Patterson, P, 1996–1998
 Corey Patterson, OF, 2000–2005
 Eric Patterson, OF, 2007–2008
 Ken Patterson, P, 1992
 David Patton, P, 2009
 Spencer Patton, P, 2016
 Josh Paul, C, 2003
 Mike Paul, P, 1973, 1974
 Dave Pavlas, P, 1990–1991
 Ted Pawelek, C, 1946
 George Pearce, P, 1912–1916
 Charlie Pechous, 3B, 1916–1917
 Jorge Pedre, C, 1992
 Chick Pedroes, OF, 1902
 Carlos Peña, 1B, 2011
 Félix Peña, P, 2016-2017
 Roberto Peña, SS, 1965–1966
 Ken Penner, P, 1929
 Joe Pepitone, 1B, 1970–1973
 Joel Peralta, P, 2016
 Hernán Pérez, IF, 2020
 Mike Pérez, P, 1995–1996
 Neifi Pérez, SS, 2004–2006
 Yorkis Pérez, P, 1991
 Harry Perkowski, P, 1955
 Jon Perlman, P, 1985
 Scott Perry, P, 1916
 Pat Perry, P, 1988, 1989
 John Peters, SS, 1874–1879
 Billy Petrick, P, 2007
 Bob Pettit, OF, 1887–1888
 Jesse Petty, P, 1930
 Big Jeff Pfeffer, P, 1905, 1910
 Fred Pfeffer, 2B, 1883–1889, 1891, 1896–1897
 Jack Pfiester, P, 1906–1911
 Josh Phegley, C, 2020
 Art Phelan, 3B, 1913–1915
 Babe Phelps, C, 1933–1934
 David Phelps, P, 2019
 Taylor Phillips, P, 1958–1959
 Adolfo Phillips, OF, 1966–1969
 Tom Phoebus, P, 1972
 Bill Phyle, P, 1898–1899
 Charlie Pick, 2B, 1918, 1919
 Eddie Pick, 3B, 1927
 Jeff Pico, P, 1988–1990
 Félix Pie, OF, 2007-2008
 Ray Pierce, P, 1924
 Andy Piercy, 2B, 1881
 Bill Piercy, P, 1926
 Juan Pierre, CF, 2005–2006
 Carmen Pignatiello, P, 2007
 George Piktuzis, P, 1956
 Horacio Piña, P, 1974
 Marc Pisciotta, P, 1997–1999
 Pinky Pittenger, SS, 1925
 Juan Pizarro, P, 1970–1973
 Whitey Platt, OF, 1942–1943
 Dan Plesac, P, 1992–1994
 Bill Plummer, C, 1968
 Tom Poholsky, P, 1957
 Howie Pollet, P, 1953–1955
 Elmer Ponder, P, 1921
 Tom Poorman, OF, 1880
 Paul Popovich, 2B, 1964–1967, 1969–1973
 Bo Porter, OF, 1999
 Bob Porterfield, P, 1959
 Bill Powell, P, 1912
 Phil Powers, C, 1878
 Willie Prall, P, 1975
 Johnny Pramesa, C, 1952
 Andy Pratt, P, 2004
 Todd Pratt, C, 1995
 Mike Prendergast, P, 1916–1917
 Tot Pressnell, P, 1941–1942
 Ray Prim, P, 1943–1946
 Don Prince, P, 1962
 Mark Prior, P, 2002–2006
 Mike Proly, P, 1982–1983
 Ed Putman, C, 1976–1978
 Zach Putnam, P, 2013
 John Pyecha, P, 1954
 Shadow Pyle, P, 1887

Q

 Jim Qualls, OF, 1969
 Joe Quest, 2B, 1879–1882
 Rubén Quevedo, P, 2000
 Wimpy Quinn, P, 1941
 Paddy Quinn, C, 1875
 Frank Quinn, OF, 1899
 Luis Quiñones, 3B, 1987
 Jose Quintana, P, 2017–present

R

 Dick Radatz, P, 1967
 Dave Rader, C, 1978
 Ken Raffensberger, P, 1940–1941
 Pat Ragan, P, 1909
 Steve Rain, P, 1999–2000
 Chuck Rainey, P, 1983–1984
 Brooks Raley, P, 2012–2013
 Bob Ramazzotti, 2B, 1949–1953
 Aramis Ramírez, 3B, 2003–11
 Neil Ramirez, P, 2014–2016
 Domingo Ramos, SS, 1989–1990
 Willie Ramsdell, P, 1952
 Fernando Ramsey, OF, 1992
 Newt Randall, OF, 1907
 Len Randle, 3B, 1980
 Merritt Ranew, C, 1963–1964
 Cody Ransom, 3B, 2013
 Clay Rapada, P, 2007
 Dennis Rasmussen, P, 1992
 Tommy Raub, C, 1903
 Bob Raudman, OF, 1966–1967
 Fred Raymer, 2B, 1901
 Colin Rea, P, 2020
 Frank Reberger, P, 1968
 Anthony Recker, C, 2012
 Jeff Reed, C, 1999–2000
 Phil Regan, P, 1968–1972
 Herman Reich, 1B, 1949
 Josh Reilly, 2B, 1896
 Hal Reilly, OF, 1919
 Laurie Reis, P, 1877–1878
 Ken Reitz, 3B, 1981
 Mike Remlinger, P,2003–2005
 Jack Remsen, OF, 1878–1879
 Laddie Renfroe, P, 1991
 Steve Renko, P, 1976, 1976
 Michael Restovich, OF, 2006
 Ed Reulbach, P, 1905–1913
 Rick Reuschel, P, 1972–1981, 1983–1984
 Paul Reuschel, P, 1975–1978
 Jose Reyes, C, 2006
 Archie Reynolds, P, 1968–1970
 Carl Reynolds, OF, 1937–1939
 Bob Rhoads, P, 1902
 Tuffy Rhodes, OF, 1993–1995
 Len Rice, C, 1945
 Del Rice, C, 1960
 Hal Rice, OF, 1954
 Clayton Richard, P, 2015-2016
 Fred Richards, 1B, 1951
 Lance Richbourg, OF, 1932
 Lew Richie, P, 1910–1913
 Beryl Richmond, P, 1933
 Reggie Richter, P, 1911
 Marv Rickert, OF, 1942–1947
 George Riley, P, 1979–1980
 Allen Ripley, P, 1982
 Rene Rivera, C, 2017
 Roberto Rivera, P, 1995
 Anthony Rizzo, 1B, 2012–2021
 Donn Roach. P, 2015
 Skel Roach, P, 1899
 Mel Roach, 2B, 1961
 Fred Roat, 3B, 1892
 Kevin Roberson, OF, 1993–1995
 Dave Roberts, P, 1977, 1978
Robin Roberts, P, 1966
 Daryl Robertson, SS, 1962
 Dave Robertson, OF, 1919–1921
 Don Robertson, OF, 1954
 Jeff Robinson, P, 1992
 Andre Rodgers, SS, 1961–1964
 Fernando Rodney. P, 2015
 Freddy Rodríguez, P, 1958
 Henry Rodríguez, OF, 1997–2000
 Henry Rodríguez, P, 2013
 Roberto Rodriquez, P, 1970
 Billy Rogell, SS, 1940
 Dan Rohn, 2B, 1983–1984
 Mel Rojas, P, 1997
 Héctor Rondón, P, 2013–2017
 Rolando Roomes, OF, 1988
 Charlie Root, P, 1926–1941
 Randy Rosario, P, 2018-2019
 Dave Rosello, 2B, 1972–1977
 John Roskos, OF, 2001
 David Ross, C, 2015–2016
 Gary Ross, P, 1968–1969
 Zac Rosscup, P, 2013–2017
 Jack Rowan, P, 1911
 Wade Rowdon, 3B, 1987
 Dave Rowe, OF, 1877
 Luther Roy, P, 1927
 Vic Roznovsky, C, 1964–1965
 Ken Rudolph, C, 1969–1973
 Dutch Rudolph, OF, 1904
 Dutch Ruether, P, 1917
 Justin Ruggiano, OF, 2014
 Glendon Rusch, P, 2004–2006
 Bob Rush, P, 1948–1957
 Chris Rusin, P, 2012–2014
 Addison Russell, 2B, 2015-2019
 Jack Russell, P, 1938–1939
 James Russell, P, 2010–2014
 Rip Russell, 1B, 1939–1942
 Dick Ruthven, P, 1983–1986
 Jason Ryan, P, 1999
 Jimmy Ryan, OF, 1885–1889, 1891–1900
 Kyle Ryan, P, 2019–2021
 Jae Kuk Ryu, P, 2006

S

 Casey Sadler, P, 2020
 Vic Saier, 1B, 1911–1917
 Jeff Samardzija, P, 2008–2014
 Luis Salazar, 3B, 1989–1992
 Ángel Salazar, SS, 1988
 Eduardo Sánchez, P, 2013
 Jesús Sánchez, P, 2002
 Félix Sánchez, P, 2003
 Rey Sánchez, SS, 1991–1997
 Ryne Sandberg, 2B, 1982–1994, 1996–1997
 Scott Sanders, P, 1998–1999
 Scott Sanderson, P, 1984–1989
 Benito Santiago, C, 1999
 Ron Santo, 3B, 1960–1973
 Dave Sappelt, OF, 2012–2013
 Ed Sauer, OF, 1943–1945
 Hank Sauer, OF, 1949–1955
 Ted Savage, OF, 1967, 1968
 Carl Sawatski, C, 1948–1953
 Bobby Scales, IF-OF, 2009-2010
 Bob Scanlan, P, 1991–1993
 Germany Schaefer, 2B, 1901–1902
 Jimmie Schaffer, C, 1963–1964
 Joe Schaffernoth, P, 1959–1961
 Bob Scheffing, C, 1941–1950
 Hank Schenz, 2B, 1946–1949
 Morrie Schick, OF, 1917
 Nate Schierholtz, OF, 2013-2014
 Calvin Schiraldi, P, 1988–1989
 Larry Schlafly, 2B, 1902
 Brian Schlitter, P, 2010, 2014–2015
 Freddy Schmidt, P, 1947
 Johnny Schmitz, P, 1941–1951
 Ed Schorr, P, 1915
 Paul Schramka, OF, 1953
 Hank Schreiber, 3B, 1926
 Pop Schriver, C, 1891–1894
 Al Schroll, P, 1960
 Art Schult, 1B, 1959–1960
 Johnny Schulte, C, 1929
 Frank Schulte, OF, 1904–1916
 Bob Schultz, P, 1951–1953
 Barney Schultz, P, 1961–1963
 Buddy Schultz, P, 1975–1976
 Joe Schultz, OF, 1915
 Don Schulze, P, 1983–1984
 Wayne Schurr, P, 1964
 Bill Schuster, SS, 1943–1945
 Kyle Schwarber, C, 2015–present 
 Rudy Schwenck, P, 1909
 Frank Schwindel, 1B, 2021-present
 Dick Scott, P, 1964
 Gary Scott, 3B, 1991–1992
 Milt Scott, 1B, 1882
 Pete Scott, OF, 1926–1927
 Rodney Scott, 2B, 1978
 Tom Seaton, P, 1916–1917
 Frank Secory, OF, 1944–1946
 Herman Segelke, P, 1982
 Kurt Seibert, 2B, 1979
 Dick Selma, P, 1969
 Mike Sember, 3B, 1977–1978
 Manny Seoane, P, 1978
 Dan Serafini, P, 1999
 Bill Serena, 3B, 1949–1954
 Scott Servais, C, 1995–1998
 Tommy Sewell, 1927
 Orator Shaffer, OF, 1879
 Art Shamsky, OF, 1972
 Red Shannon, 2B, 1926
 Bobby Shantz, P, 1964
 Sam Shaw, P, 1893
 Bob Shaw, P, 1967
 Marty Shay, 2B, 1916
 Al Shealy, P, 1930
 Dave Shean, 2B, 1911
 Jimmy Sheckard, OF, 1906–1912
 Tommy Shields, 2B, 1993
 Clyde Shoun, P, 1935–1937
 Terry Shumpert, 2B, 1996
 Ed Sicking, 2B, 1916
 Walter Signer, P, 1943–1945
 Carlos Silva, P, 2010
 Charlie Silvera, C, 1957
 Curt Simmons, P, 1966, 1967
 Randall Simon, 1B, 2003
 Duke Simpson, P, 1953
 Elmer Singleton, P, 1957–1959
 Ted Sizemore, 2B, 1979
 Roe Skidmore, 1970
 Jimmy Slagle, OF, 1902–1908
 Cy Slapnicka, P, 1911
 Sterling Slaughter, P, 1964
 Lefty Sloat, P, 1949
 Heathcliff Slocumb, P, 1991–1993
 Roy Smalley, SS, 1948–1953
 Aleck Smith, C, 1904
 Bob Smith, P, 1931–1932
 Bob Smith, P, 1959
 Bobby Smith, OF, 1962
 Bull Smith, OF, 1906
 Charley Smith, 3B, 1969
 Charlie Smith, P, 1911–1914
 Dave Smith, P, 1991–1992
 Dwight Smith, OF, 1989–1993
 Earl Smith, OF, 1916
 Greg Smith, 2B, 1989–1990
 Harry Smith, 2B, 1877
 Jason Smith, 2B, 2001
 Joe Smith, P, 2016
 Lee Smith, P, 1980–1987
 Paul Smith, 1B, 1958
 Willie Smith, OF, 1968–1970
 Steve Smyth, P,2002
 Brad Snyder, OF, 2010
 Miguel Socolovich, P, 2012
 Jorge Soler, OF, 2014–2016
 Marcelino Solis, P, 1958
 Eddie Solomon, P, 1975
 Andy Sommers, C, 1889
 Rudy Sommers, P, 1912
 Lary Sorensen, P, 1985
 Alfonso Soriano, LF, 2007–2013
 Rafael Soriano, P, 2015
 Sammy Sosa, OF, 1992–2004
 Geovany Soto, C, 2005–12
 Steven Souza Jr., OF, 2020
 Al Spalding, P, 1876–1878
 Al Spangler, OF, 1967–1971
 Bob Speake, OF, 1955–1957
 Justin Speier, P, 1998
 Chris Speier, SS, 1985–1986
 Rob Sperring, 2B, 1974–1976
 Carl Spongberg, P, 1908
 Jerry Spradlin, P,2000
 Charlie Sprague, OF, 1887
 Jack Spring, P, 1964
 Jim St. Vrain, P, 1902
 Eddie Stack, P, 1913–1914
 Tuck Stainback, OF, 1934–1937
 Matt Stairs, OF, 2001
 Gale Staley, 2B, 1925
 Pete Standridge, P, 1915
 Eddie Stanky, 2B, 1943, 1944
 Joe Stanley, OF, 1909
 Tom Stanton, C, 1904
 Ray Starr, P, 1945
 Joe Start, 1B, 1878
 Jigger Statz, OF, 1922–1925
 Ed Stauffer, P, 1923
 John Stedronsky, 3B, 1879
 Kennie Steenstra, P, 1998
 Ed Stein, P, 1890–1891
 Randy Stein, P, 1982
 Harry Steinfeldt, 3B, 1906–1910
 Rick Stelmaszek, C, 1974
 Jake Stenzel, OF, 1890
 Earl Stephenson, P, 1971
 Joe Stephenson, C, 1944
 John Stephenson, C, 1967–1968
 Phil Stephenson, 1B, 1989
 Riggs Stephenson, OF, 1926–1934
 Walter Stephenson, C, 1935–1936
 Dave Stevens, P, 1997–1998
 Jeff Stevens, P, 2009–11
 Morrie Steevens, P, 1962
 Ace Stewart, 2B, 1895
 Ian Stewart, 3B, 2012
 Jimmy Stewart, OF, 1963–1967
 Mack Stewart, P, 1944–1945
 Tuffy Stewart, OF, 1913–1914
 Tim Stoddard, P, 1984
 Steve Stone, P, 1974–1976
 Bill Stoneman, P, 1967–1968
 Dan Straily, P, 2014
 Joe Strain, 2B, 1981
 Sammy Strang, 3B, 1900, 1902
 Doug Strange, 3B, 1991–1992
 Scott Stratton, P, 1894, 1895
 Lou Stringer, 2B, 1941–1946
 Pedro Strop, P, 2013–2019
 George Stueland, P, 1921–1925
 Bobby Sturgeon, SS, 1940–1947
 Tanyon Sturtze, P, 1995–1996
 Chris Stynes, 3B, 2002
 Bill Sullivan, OF, 1878
 John Sullivan, OF, 1921
 Marty Sullivan, OF, 1887–1888
 Mike Sullivan, P, 1890
 Champ Summers, OF, 1975–1976
 Billy Sunday, OF, 1883–1887
 Jim Sundberg, C, 1987–1988
 Rick Sutcliffe, P, 1984–1991
 Sy Sutcliffe, C, 1884–1885
Bruce Sutter, P, 1976–1980
 Dave Swartzbaugh, P, 1995–1997
 Bill Sweeney, 2B, 1907, 1914
 Ryan Sweeney, OF, 2013–2014
 Les Sweetland, P, 1931
 Steve Swisher, C, 1974–1977
 Matt Szczur, OF, 2014–2017

T

 Jerry Tabb, 1B, 1976
 Pat Tabler, 1B, 1981–1982
 So Taguchi, OF, 2009
 Hisanori Takahashi, P, 2013
 Bob Talbot, OF, 1953–1954
 Chuck Tanner, OF, 1957, 1958
 Kevin Tapani, P, 1996–2001
 El Tappe, C, 1954–1962
 Ted Tappe, OF, 1955
 Bennie Tate, C, 1934
 Ramón Tatís, P, 1997
 Julián Tavárez, P,2001
 Chink Taylor, OF, 1925
 Danny Taylor, OF, 1929–1932
 Harry Taylor, 1B, 1932
 Jack Taylor (1900s pitcher), P, 1898-1903, 1906-1907 
 Sammy Taylor, C, 1958–1962
 Tony Taylor, 2B, 1958–1960
 Zack Taylor, C, 1929–1933
 Bud Teachout, P, 1930–1931
 Taylor Teagarden, C, 2014-2015
 Patsy Tebeau, 1B, 1887
 Amaury Telemaco, P, 1996–1998
 John Tener, P, 1888–1889
 Ryan Tepera, p, 2020
 Adonis Terry, P, 1894–1897
 Zeb Terry, SS, 1920–1922
 Wayne Terwilliger, 2B, 1949–1951
 Bob Tewksbury, P, 1987–1988
 Moe Thacker, C, 1958–1962
 Ryan Theriot, 2B, 2005–2010
 Red Thomas, OF, 1921
 Frank Thomas, OF, 1960–1961, 1966
 Lee Thomas, OF, 1966–1967
 Scot Thompson, OF, 1978–1983
 Bobby Thomson, OF, 1958–1959
 Andre Thornton, DH, 1973–1976
 Walter Thornton, OF, 1895–1898
 Bob Thorpe, P, 1955
 Dick Tidrow, P, 1979–1982
 Bobby Tiefenauer, P, 1968
 Ozzie Timmons, OF, 1995–1996
 Ben Tincup, P, 1928
Joe Tinker, SS, 1902–1912, 1916
 Bud Tinning, P, 1932–1934
 Al Todd, C, 1940–1943
 Jim Todd, P, 1974, 1977
 Chick Tolson, 1B, 1926–1930
 Ron Tompkins, P, 1971
 Fred Toney, P, 1911–1913
 Héctor Torres, SS, 1971
 Paul Toth, P, 1962–1964
 Steve Trachsel, P, 1993–1999, 2007
 Chad Tracy, 1B-3B, 2010
 Jim Tracy, OF, 1980–1981
 Bill Traffley, C, 1878
 Fred Treacey, OF, 1874
 Bill Tremel, P, 1954–1956
 Manny Trillo, 2B, 1975–1978, 1986–1988
 Coaker Triplett, OF, 1938
 Steve Trout, P, 1983–1987
 Harry Truby, 2B, 1895–1896
 Jen-Ho Tseng, P, 2017
 Michael Tucker, OF, 2001
 Pete Turgeon, SS, 1923
 Jacob Turner, P, 2014
 Ted Turner, P, 1920
 Babe Twombly, OF, 1920–1921
 Lefty Tyler, P, 1918–1921
 Earl Tyree, C, 1914
 Jim Tyrone, OF, 1972–1975
 Wayne Tyrone, OF, 1976
 Mike Tyson, 2B, 1980–1981

U

 Koji Uehara, P, 2017
 Duane Underwood Jr., P, 2018, 2020–present
 John Upham, P, 1967–1968
 Bob Usher, OF, 1952

V

 Mike Vail, OF, 1978–1980
 Chris Valaika, 3B, 2014
 Luis Valbuena, 3B, 2012–2014
 Pedro Valdés, OF, 1994–1998
 Ismael Valdez, P, 2000
 Vito Valentinetti, P, 1956–1957
 Jermaine Van Buren, P, 2005
 George Van Haltren, OF, 1887–1889
 Todd Van Poppel, P, 2000–2001
 Ben Van Ryn, P, 1998
 Ike Van Zandt, OF, 1904
 Hy Vandenberg, P, 1944–1945
 Johnny Vander Meer, P, 1950
 Andy Varga, P, 1950–1951
 Ildemaro Vargas, IF, 2020
 Gary Varsho, OF, 1988–1990
 Hippo Vaughn, P, 1913–1921
 Emil Verban, 2B, 1948–1950
 José Veras, P, 2014
 Randy Veres, P, 1994
 Dave Veres, P,2003
 Joe Vernon, P, 1912
 Tom Veryzer, SS, 1983–1984
 Tom Vickery, P, 1891
 Carlos Villanueva, P, 2013–2014
 Héctor Villanueva, C, 1990–1992
 Josh Vitters, 3B, 2012
 Arodys Vizcaíno, P, 2014
 José Vizcaíno, SS, 1991–1993
 Luis Vizcaíno, P, 2009
 Otto Vogel, OF, 1923–1924
 Bill Voiselle, P, 1950
 Chris Volstad, P, 2012

W

 Tsuyoshi Wada, P, 2014-2015
 Jason Waddell, P, 2009
Rube Waddell, P, 1901
 Ben Wade, P, 1948
 Gale Wade, OF, 1955–1956
 Dave Wainhouse, P, 2000–2001
 Eddie Waitkus, 1B, 1941–1948
 Charlie Waitt, OF, 1877
 Matt Walbeck, C, 1993
 Chico Walker, OF, 1985–1987, 1991–1992
 Harry Walker, OF, 1949
 Mike Walker, P, 1995
 Roy Walker, P, 1917–1918
 Rube Walker, C, 1948–1951
 Todd Walker, 2B, 2004–2006
 Jack Wallace, C, 1915
 Tye Waller, 3B, 1981–1982
 Joe Wallis, OF, 1975–1978
 Lee Walls, OF, 1957–1959
 Les Walrond, P, 2006
 Tom Walsh, C, 1906
 Jerome Walton, OF, 1989–1992
 Chris Ward, OF, 1972–1974
 Daryle Ward, IF, 2007–2008
 Dick Ward, P, 1934
 Preston Ward, 1B, 1950–1953
 Lon Warneke, P, 1930–1936, 1942, 1943–1945
 Hooks Warner, 3B, 1921
 Jack Warner, P, 1962–1965
 Adam Warren, P, 2016
 Rabbit Warstler, SS, 1940
 Carl Warwick, OF, 1966
 Fred Waterman, 3B, 1875
 Logan Watkins, 2B, 2013—2014
 Doc Watson, P, 1913
 Eddie Watt, P, 1975
 David Weathers, P,2001
 Harry Weaver, P, 1917–1919
 Jim Weaver, P, 1934
 Orlie Weaver, P, 1910–1911
 Earl Webb, OF, 1927–1928
 Allen Webster, P, 2018
 Ray Webster, 1B, 1971
 Mitch Webster, OF, 1988–1989
 Jake Weimer, P, 1903–1905
 Lefty Weinert, P, 1927–1928
 Butch Weis, OF, 1922–1925
 Johnny Welch, P, 1926–1931
 Todd Wellemeyer, P, 2003–2006
 Randy Wells, P, 2008–12
 Turk Wendell, P, 1993–1997
 Don Wengert, P, 1998
 Rip Wheeler, P, 1923–1924
 Pete Whisenant, OF, 1956
 Deacon White, 3B, 1876
 Derrick White, 1B, 1998
 Elder White, SS, 1962
 Jerry White, OF, 1978
 Rondell White, OF, 2000–2001
 Warren White, 3B, 1875
 Earl Whitehill, P, 1939
 Eli Whiteside, C, 2014
 Rowan Wick, P, 2019–present
 Bob Wicker, P, 1903–1906
 Brad Wieck, P, 2019–present
 Charlie Wiedemeyer, P, 1934
 Milt Wilcox, P, 1975
Hoyt Wilhelm, P, 1970
 Harry Wilke, 3B, 1927
 Curtis Wilkerson, SS, 1989–1990
 Dean Wilkins, P, 1989–1990
 Rick Wilkins, C, 1991–1995
 Bob Will, OF, 1957–1963
 Art Williams, OF, 1902
 Billy Williams, OF, 1959–1974
 Brian Williams, P, 2000
 Cy Williams, OF, 1912–1917
 Dewey Williams, C, 1944–1947
 Jerome Williams, P, 2005–2006
 Mitch Williams, P, 1989–1990
 Otto Williams, SS, 1903–1904
 Pop Williams, P, 1902–1903
 Wash Williams, OF, 1885
 Scott Williamson, P, 2005–2006
 Ned Williamson, 3B, 1879–1889
 Jim Willis, P, 1953–1954
 Bump Wills, 2B, 1982
 Walt Wilmot, OF, 1890–1895
 Art Wilson, C, 1916–1917
 Enrique Wilson, 2B, 2005
Hack Wilson, OF, 1926–1931
 Justin Wilson, P, 2017-2018
 Steve Wilson, P, 1989–1991
 Willie Wilson, OF, 1993–1994
 Ed Winceniak, 3B, 1956–1957
 Dan Winkler, P, 2020
 Kettle Wirts, C, 1921–1923
 Patrick Wisdom, 3B, 2020
 Casey Wise, 2B, 1957
 Harry Wolfe, SS, 1917
 Harry Wolter, OF, 1917
 Harry Wolverton, 3B, 1898–1900
 Tony Womack, 2B, 2003, 2006
 Kerry Wood, P, 1998–2008, 2011-2012
 Travis Wood, P, 2012—2016
 Brad Woodall, P, 1999–2000
 Gary Woods, OF, 1982–1985
 Jim Woods, 3B, 1957
 Walt Woods, P, 1898
 Tim Worrell, P, 2000
 Chuck Wortman, SS, 1916–1918
 Bob Wright, P, 1915
 Dave Wright, P, 1897
 Mel Wright, P, 1960–1961
 Pat Wright, 2B, 1890
 Wesley Wright, P, 2014
 Rick Wrona, C, 1988–1990
 Michael Wuertz, P, 2004–2007
 Marvell Wynne, OF, 1989–1990
 Hank Wyse, P, 1942–1947

Y

 George Yantz, C, 1912
 Eric Yelding, SS, 1993
 Carroll Yerkes, P, 1932–1933
 Steve Yerkes, 2B, 1916
 Lefty York, P, 1921
 Tony York, SS, 1944
 Gus Yost, P, 1893
 Elmer Yoter, 3B, 1927–1928
 Anthony Young, P, 1994–1995
 Danny Young, P, 2000
 Don Young, OF, 1965–1969
 Eric Young, 2B, 2000–2001

Z

 Zip Zabel, P, 1913–1915
 Mark Zagunis, OF, 2017-2019
 Geoff Zahn, P, 1975, 1976
 Carlos Zambrano, P, 2001–11
 Eduardo Zambrano, OF, 1993–1994
 Oscar Zamora, P, 1974–1976
 Rob Zastryzny, P, 2016-2018
 Rollie Zeider, 2B, 1916–1918
 Todd Zeile, 3B, 1995
 George Zettlein, P, 1874–1875
 Bob Zick, P, 1954
 Don Zimmer, 3B, 1960–1961
 Heinie Zimmerman, 3B, 1907–1916
 Ben Zobrist, 2B, 2016-2019
 Julio Zuleta, 1B, 2000–2001
 Dutch Zwilling, OF, 1916

Sources
 Chicago Cubs official web site

Roster
Major League Baseball all-time rosters